Villa Maria Academy are two connected historic school buildings located at Erie, Erie County, Pennsylvania. It was built in 1892, with additions and alterations in 1904 and 1927.  The original building, known as the motherhouse, is a 2 1/2-story, red brick building with terra cotta trim in the High Victorian Gothic style. It features a cross gable roof with dormers and two conical roof turrets.  The 3 1/2-story addition was completed in 1904.  It is in the Gothic style and features parapet walls, a second story projecting bay, terra cotta decoration, and a hipped roof with dormers.  Gannon Hall was built in 1927 and is connected to the original academy building by a two-story bridge. It is a 3 1/2-story, gable roofed building in the Late Gothic Revival style.  The brick building features stepped gable dormers and the College Chapel section with stained glass windows, conical roof tower, and pointed buttresses. The College Chapel, also known as Villa Chapel, was added to Preservation Pennsylvania At Risk List in 2011.

It was added to the National Register of Historic Places in 1996.

References

School buildings on the National Register of Historic Places in Pennsylvania
Gothic Revival architecture in Pennsylvania
1892 establishments in Pennsylvania
Buildings and structures in Erie, Pennsylvania
National Register of Historic Places in Erie County, Pennsylvania